The Women's 4×100 Medley Relay Swimming event at the XVI Pan American Games was swum on 21 October 2011 in Guadalajara, Mexico.

The defending champion in the event was the United States.

Records
Prior to this competition, the existing world and Pan American Games records were as follows:

Results
Key: q= qualified for finals; GR= Games Record; NR= national record.

Preliminary heats

Final

References

Swimming at the 2011 Pan American Games
4 × 100 metre medley relay
2011 in women's swimming